SVSN Varma is an Indian independent politician. He was member of the Telugu Desam Party. Varma is a former member of the Andhra Pradesh Legislative Assembly from the Pithapuram constituency in East Godavari district as an Independent and joined Telugu Desam Party.

References 

People from East Godavari district
Independent politicians in India
Telugu Desam Party politicians
Members of the Andhra Pradesh Legislative Assembly
Living people
Telugu politicians
21st-century Indian politicians
Year of birth missing (living people)